The Reason is the fourth studio album by English singer Lemar. It was released by Epic Records on 24 November 2008 in the United Kingdom. His debut with the label, the album saw Lemar working with a wider range of US songwriters and producers, including Claude Kelly, Jim Beanz, Jim Jonsin, and Salaam Remi. The Reason contains the singles, "If She Knew" and "Weight of the World."

Background
Speaking to the UK R&B writer Pete Lewis of Blues & Soul in November 2008, Lemar explained the thinking behind titling his fourth album The Reason: "I called the album The Reason because I wanted it to remind me of the reason why I became a musician in the first place. You know, I think the reason I became a recording artist was because the music I was listening to at the time was inspirational, exciting; it wasn't obvious [...] And that's what I wanted THIS album to be. I wanted to bring out a collection of songs that for me was inspiring, was thought-provoking, was current, and that hopefully came with an exciting, eclectic mix of styles."

Promotion

Singles
"If She Knew" was released for download at midnight on 6 November 2008. From two full days of download sales, the single debuted on the UK Singles Chart at number 61. The following Monday two physical formats were released additionally and the song climbed to its peak of number 14. The third week it fell to number 19 and the fourth to number 21. The second single, "Weight of the World", was released on 2 March 2009. Although it was not released as a single, "Mayday" was later included on Lemar's The Hits album, released on 1 March 2010.

The Reason Tour 2009

Dates

Notes
 The concert in Reading was cancelled.
 Concerts after 27 March were supported by British boy band JLS.

Critical reception

95.8 Capital FM called The Reason a "consistent effort" which "leans slightly closer towards a more US-style R&B sound than on some of his previous material." Orange critic Chris Long found that "for the most part, The Reason is as solid a pop-soul album as you'll find and, while it does struggle to hit greatness, there is nothing across it that dips below decent [...] While [it] does suffer from over-polished production that lessens its emotional blows and occasionally strays toward the edge of sterility, it still manages to deliver a clutch of songs." Peter Robinson from The Observer called the album an "enjoyably addictive listen" that is at "best when [Lemar] grasps the electronic R&B coat tails of US stars like Ne-Yo and Chris Brown."

AllMusic editor Jon O'Brien noted that "it's undoubtedly a more concerted effort to halt the worrying career slide [...] But rather than panicking and overloading its ten tracks with processed beats and Hi-NRG trance riffs, The Reason wisely plays it more subtle, bridging the gap between his old-fashioned previous output and a more modern electro-focused sound [...] While [its] lack of originality still leaves Lemar searching for a full body of work that lives up to the standards of his vocal talents, its blend of old school and new school is a marked improvement on his previous vintage soulman routine." Similarly, Priya Elan from The Times wrote: "Lemar proves that he is good enough to compete with his US counterparts (Chris Brown, Ne Yo) [...] There is a problem with the faster songs – too many of them drift by and lack the hooks of the more epic numbers. But that is a minor gripe – all in all The Reason shows Lemar to be one of the best British R&B artists."

Chart performance
The Reason entered the UK Albums Chart at number 41 on the week closing 30 November 2008. This marked Lemar's lowest-charting entry by then.

Track listing

Charts

References

External links
 Lemar interview by Pete Lewis, 'Blues & Soul' December 2008

2008 albums
Lemar albums
Albums produced by Jim Jonsin